Indra Wijaya (born 16 March 1974) is a former badminton player who initially represented Indonesia and subsequently Singapore. After his retirement, he started a new career as a coach. 

Wijaya was born in a badminton family, his sibling Candra, Rendra and Sandrawati was a former Indonesian player. Indra Wijaya played for Indonesia between 1995 and 2000; He was part of the national team that won the Thomas Cup in 1998. He subsequently moved to Singapore, becoming a citizen, and represented the country thereafter.

After his retirement, Wijaya started a new career as a coach at the Candra Wijaya International Badminton Centre, after that he was accepted as a men's singles coach in South Korean team. In 2016, he started coaching junior players in Malaysia.

Achievements

World Cup 
Men's singles

Asian Championships 
Men's singles

IBF World Grand Prix 
The World Badminton Grand Prix was sanctioned by the International Badminton Federation from 1983 to 2006.

Men's singles

IBF International 
Men's singles

References

External links 
 

1974 births
Living people
People from Cirebon
Indonesian male badminton players
Competitors at the 1997 Southeast Asian Games
Southeast Asian Games gold medalists for Indonesia
Southeast Asian Games medalists in badminton
Singaporean male badminton players
Badminton coaches
Indonesian expatriate sportspeople in Singapore
Indonesian expatriate sportspeople in South Korea
Indonesian expatriate sportspeople in Malaysia